Katende Ssempebwa & Co. Advocates commonly known as KATS is a Ugandan law firm whose headquarters are in Kampala, the capital city of Uganda. It is the country's longest-standing premier league corporate commercial firm founded in 1969. It is the biggest full-service Ugandan firm in terms of numbers and a member of the LEXAfrica network.

The firm's managing partner is John W. Katende. Co-founding partner Professor Frederick E. Ssempebwa’s advice is sought on Uganda's constitutional matters and on regional mandates. Over the years, the firm has advised governments, non-governmental organizations, multinationals, and other business entities. One of the noteworthy deals saw the firm give a hand to Warid Telecom Uganda on its $500 million merger with Bharti Airtel in 2013. The firm also advised the Government of Uganda on the development of a $3 billion oil refinery - the first of its kind in Uganda.

The firm played a pivotal role in Uganda's U-turn on the death penalty in 2007 by helping to prove to the Constitutional Court that the death penalty for murder and other offenses was unconstitutional. Katende Ssempebwa had earlier on played a fundamental role in erasing all sub-sections of the Constitution of the Republic of Uganda that had in 1966 abolished traditional institutions from the country. Simultaneously, the firm also managed to come up with relevant laws that enabled the return of all the properties that had been forcefully confiscated from Buganda and other Kingdoms by former Ugandan regimes. These constitutional amendments eventually led to the coronation of Kabaka Ronald Muwenda Mutebi II and other traditional rulers in 1993.

History
Katende Ssempebwa was founded by John W. Katende and Frederick E. Ssempebwa in 1969. Over nearly five decades, the firm has grown into a limited liability partnership of ten partners, fifteen associates and thirty-five support staff and interns. Over the years, the firm has been involved in many developments in the legal field.

Location
Although the firm's primary offices are located in the heart of Kampala’s city center, Katende Ssempebwa maintains a presence in all the major capitals, tax havens and financial centers of the world through its international legal networks.

Notable clients
The firm has provided legal services to the Government of the Republic of Uganda, Samsung, Google, Puma, Facebook, Goldman Sachs, Total, Siemens, KLM Royal Dutch Airlines, Vodafone, Nokia, Airtel (U) Limited, Qatar Airways, Coca-Cola, Eastern and Southern Africa Development Bank (PTA Bank), Equity Bank (U) Limited, NC Bank (U) Limited, and Turkish Airlines, among others.

Practice areas
Katende Ssempebwa is a full-service advisory law firm whose practice is fourfold: Transactional & Advisory services, Litigation & Alternative Dispute Resolution, Intellectual Property and Business development:

Transactional and advisory services
This involves legal practice in the following areas:

Anti-trust/ Competition, Aviation Law, Banking & Finance, Bankruptcy, Debt recovery, Receiverships, Capital markets, Corporate & Commercial Law, Company Secretarial services, Employment /Labour, Energy, oil & gas, Entertainment, Environment, Family Law, Immigration, Insurance, International Trade, Mergers & Acquisitions, Mining, 
Non-Profit Organisations, Project Finance, Property / Real Estate, Public-Private Partnerships (PPP), Tax & Compliance, Telecom, Media & Technology.

Litigation and alternative dispute resolution
The firm has been involved in several groundbreaking, law-making, and landmark litigation cases that have shaped the laws of East Africa and many of which are compulsory reading at all East African law schools. KATS litigation practice falls into three categories: Civil & Commercial, Criminal and Constitutional

Intellectual property
The firm has an Intellectual Property department that handles all matters concerning trademarks, patents, copyright, industrial designs, and trade secrets.

Business Support
The firm offers Business Support services to assist clients in registering, running, and maintaining their businesses. This includes but is not limited to: Company Secretarial services, Work permits and Citizenship applications, Private investigations, and Estate management.

Memberships
 Uganda Law Society (ULS)
 East African Law Society (EALS)
 The International Bar Association
 World Services Group (WSG)
 LEXAfrica Network
 International Trademark Association (INTA)

Awards and rankings
The 2018 IFLR1000's law rankings for Katende Ssempebwa indicate that it is a "Tier 1" firm in both Financial & Corporate and Project Development practice areas. The firm has been consistently ranked a Tier 1 firm by IFLR1000 in its 2009, 2010, 2011, 2012, 2013, 2014, 2015, 2016, 2017, and 2018 Editions.

Katende Ssempebwa is ranked as a "Band 1" Ugandan law firm in the 2018 Edition of Chambers & Partners Global Guide to the World's Leading Lawyers for Business. KATS has been consistently ranked as a "Band 1" firm by Chambers in its 2000, 2001, 2002, 2003, 2004, 2005, 2006, 2007, 2008, 2009, 2010, 2011, 2012, 2013, 2014, 2015, 2016, 2017 and 2018 Editions.

The firm's founding partners, John W. Katende and Professor Frederick E. Ssempebwa are ranked as the only Ugandan "Senior Statesmen" (lawyers who no longer work hands-on with the same intensity but who, by virtue of close links with major clients, remain pivotal to the firm's success) in the 2018 Edition of Chambers & Partners. They have been consistently recognized by Chambers for the past 18 years.

Sim K. Katende, one of the firm's partners, is ranked as a "Band 1" transaction lawyer in the same publication. He has been recognized by Chambers in the 2008, 2009, 2010, 2011, 2012, 2013, 2014, 2015, 2016, 2017 and 2018 Editions.

The firm's senior partners John W. Katende and Professor Frederick E. Ssempebwa, plus partners Sim K. Katende and Soogi Katende, are ranked as "highly regarded" lawyers by IFLR1000 – Guide to the World's Leading Financial Law Firms 2018 Edition.  The practitioners have been recognized by IFLR1000 as "leading transactional" lawyers in 2009, 2010, 2011, 2012, 2013, 2014, 2015, 2016, and 2017 Editions.

Arthur Katende, a Principal Associate, is deemed a "rising star" by the same publication in its 2015, 2016, 2017, and 2018 editions.

See also
 Law Development Centre
 Uganda Law Society

References

External links
  Official website
 CHAMBERS & PARTNERS: Your guide to the world’s best lawyers
 IFLR1000: The Guide to the World's Leading Financial Law Firms
 Lex Africa: Network of Law Firms in Africa
 World Services Group

1969 establishments in Uganda
Law firms of Uganda
Law firms established in 1969